The 22nd Lumières Awards ceremony, presented by the Académie des Lumières, was held at the Théâtre de la Madeleine in Paris on 30 January 2017 to honour the best in French films of 2016. The nominations were announced on 16 December 2016.

Elle won three awards, including Best Film.

Winners and nominees

Films with multiple nominations and awards

The following films received multiple nominations:

The following films received multiple awards:

See also
 42nd César Awards
 7th Magritte Awards

References

External links
 
 
 Lumières Awards at AlloCiné

Lumières Awards
Lumières
Lumières
January 2017 events in France